Nuno Mendes (born 10 May 1984 in Porto) is a Portuguese rower. He started competitive rowing in 1994 and currently represents Sporting Clube de Portugal. Competing in the lightweight double sculls category (LM2x) with Pedro Fraga, he finished in 5th place at the 2012 Summer Olympics in London, and won two silver medals at the 2010 and 2012 European Rowing Championships.

References

Rowers at the 2008 Summer Olympics
Rowers at the 2012 Summer Olympics
Portuguese male rowers
Olympic rowers of Portugal
Sportspeople from Porto
1984 births
Living people
European Rowing Championships medalists